Meshaal Al-Shammeri (Arabic:مشعل الشمري) (born 19 January 1995) is a Qatari footballer. He currently plays for Al-Sailiya .

External links
 

Qatari footballers
1995 births
Living people
Al Sadd SC players
Al Kharaitiyat SC players
Al-Sailiya SC players
Qatar Stars League players
Association football forwards
Footballers at the 2018 Asian Games
Asian Games competitors for Qatar